.scot  is a GeoTLD for Scotland and Scottish culture, including the Gaelic and Scots languages.

Later it was decided to allow almost any top-level domain for introduction some time in 2013, and a list of applications for these was published in June 2012; the domain .scot was included.

On 27 January 2014, dotScot Registry, a not-for-profit organization established in 2009, announced that it had agreed terms to operate the .scot domain name, with plans to get it up and running later in summer of 2014.

On 15 July 2014, .scot was officially launched. The first .scot domain name to go live was calico.scot, registered by hosting company Calico Internet Ltd.

On 17 February 2015, the Scottish Government migrated its website from scotland.gov.uk to gov.scot. Likewise, the Scottish Parliament moved from scottish.parliament.uk to parliament.scot in May 2016, to coincide with the 2016 elections.

The 2017 Global Amendment to the base New GeoTLD Registry Agreement is effective as of 31 July 2017.

On 3 May 2018 the dotScot Registry lifted registration restrictions on locality domains (based on towns, etc.) and other premium names.

See also
.ie
.irish
.cymru

References

External links
 dotScot Registry

Scot
Scot
2014 establishments in Scotland
Internet in Scotland
Computer-related introductions in 2014